Nickel(II) thiocyanate is a coordination polymer with formula Ni(SCN)2. It is a green-brown solid and its crystal structure was determined first in 1982.

Structure 
The structure of Ni(SCN)2 was determined via single-crystal X-ray diffraction and consists of two-dimensional sheets held together through Van der Waals forces. It belongs to mercury thiocyanate structure-type and can be considered a distorted form of the NiBr2 (CdI2) structure. Each nickel is octahedrally coordinated by four sulfurs and two nitrogens. The sulfur end of the SCN- ligand is doubly bridging.

Synthesis 
Nickel(II) thiocyanate can be prepared via salt metathesis using the reaction of methanolic solutions of KSCN and nickel(II) perchlorate hexahydrate, filtering off the precipitated KClO4 to yield a solution of Ni(SCN)2. On removal of the methanol, a pure microcrystalline powder of Ni(SCN)2 can be obtained.

Magnetism 
Nickel(II) thiocyanate, like nickel(II) iodide, nickel(II) bromide and nickel(II) chloride, is an antiferromagnet at low temperatures.

References 

Nickel compounds
Coordination polymers